Catherine Fournier may refer to:
 Catherine Fournier (Canadian politician) (born 1992)
 Catherine Fournier (French politician) (1955–2021)